The Animal Drug and Animal Generic Drug User Fee Reauthorization Act of 2013 is a bill that was introduced into the United States Senate during the 113th United States Congress.  The bill would authorize the collection of fees by the Food and Drug Administration for use to fund activities related to the approval of drugs for animals.  The bill would amend the Federal Food, Drug, and Cosmetic Act.

The bill was signed by President Barack Obama on June 13, 2013, becoming .

Background

Provisions/Elements of the bill

The Animal Drug and Animal Generic Drug User Fee Reauthorization Act of 2013 would authorize the collection and spending of fees by the Food and Drug Administration (FDA) for certain activities to expedite the development and marketing approval of drugs for use in animals. Fees would supplement appropriated funds to cover FDA’s costs associated with reviewing certain applications and investigational submissions for brand and generic animal drugs. Such fees could be collected and made available for obligation only to the extent and in the amounts provided in advance in appropriation acts. The legislation would extend through fiscal year 2018, and make several technical changes to, FDA’s existing fee programs for brand and generic animal drugs, which expire at the end of fiscal year 2013.

Procedural history

Senate
The Animal Drug and Animal Generic Drug User Fee Reauthorization Act of 2013 was introduced into the United States Senate on March 20, 2013 by Senator Tom Harkin (D-Iowa).  On May 8, 2013, the bill passed the Senate by Unanimous consent.

House
The Animal Drug and Animal Generic Drug User Fee Reauthorization Act of 2013 was received in the United States House of Representatives on May 9, 2013.  It passed the House on June 3, 2013 by a vote of 390-12, recorded in Roll Call Vote 185.

Debate and discussion

See also
List of bills in the 113th United States Congress
Animal drugs
Veterinary medicine in the United States
Federal Food, Drug, and Cosmetic Act

Notes/References

External links

Library of Congress - Thomas S. 622
beta.congress.gov S. 622
GovTrack.us S. 622
OpenCongress.org S. 622
WashingtonWatch.com S. 622
Congressional Budget Office's report on S. 622
House Republicans' Report on S. 622

United States federal health legislation
Acts of the 113th United States Congress
Food and Drug Administration
Veterinary medicine in the United States
Veterinary drugs